Franklinville is an unincorporated community in Lowndes County, in the U.S. state of Georgia.

History
Franklinville was once the county seat of Lowndes County.

References

Ghost towns in Georgia (U.S. state)
Former county seats in Georgia (U.S. state)
Unincorporated communities in Lowndes County, Georgia